Bagh-e Komesh (also Romanized as Bāgh-e Komesh and Bāgh Komesh; also known as Bākūmīs) is a village in, and the capital of, Bagh-e Komesh Rural District of the Central District of Pardis County, Tehran province, Iran.

At the 2006 National Census, its population was 1,358 in 358 households, when it was in Siyahrud Rural District of the Central District of Tehran County. The following census in 2011 counted 1,916 people in 549 households. The latest census in 2016 showed a population of 2,566 people in 750 households, by which time the village was in Karasht Rural District of Bumehen District in the newly established Pardis County; it was the largest village in its rural district. After the census, the Central District was established by separating the rural district and the city of Pardis from Bumahen District, and Bagh-e Komesh became the capital of the newly established Bagh-e Komesh Rural District therein.

References 

Pardis County

Populated places in Tehran Province

Populated places in Pardis County